There are several kinds of hockey tape used by ice hockey, field hockey, roller hockey, and lacrosse players: stick (or blade) tape, shin pad tape and grip tapes.

Stick tape
Stick tape comes in two forms. The original hockey stick tape was a type of friction tape. Back when hockey was first being played, hockey sticks were both rare and fragile. If a player's stick developed a crack they needed a way to make it last longer. Friction tape was originally an electrical insulating tape and was readily available. Players found that wrapping the stick blade in friction tape helped the stick last longer and also found an added side benefit that it improved control of the puck. Friction tape has a very heavy cohesive coating of rubber on both sides. Pro hockey players still refer to this as "Gordie Howe tape" because he used it. Some players still use friction tape, but it is often dissuaded from use by arenas, as the black material making it up transfers onto the puck and causes sneaker-like streaks along the edge boards and glass of the rink.

The second is a cloth-based self-adhesive, made of non-elastic cotton cloth or synthetic fibers and first came into use in the late 1960s or early 1970s. Depending on the level of play, this tape may only last one or two games on the blade of a hockey stick. With an adhesive only on one side of the backing cloth it is much lighter than friction tape which appealed to many hockey players. Modern cloth stick tapes are produced in white, black and a large variety of colors to match team uniforms and printed patterns for decorative appeal. This tape can be used for:
 taping the stick handle to allow for a better grip
 taping the stick blade to protect it from wearing and provide a grip on the puck
 taping the lower part of the stick shaft to prevent damage from another player hacking at the stick
 taping the blade proceeding from heel to toe also allows for a player to impart more spin on a puck, adding to a shot or pass' accuracy

This kind of tape is also used in field hockey and lacrosse.

Shin tape
Shin tape is a polyethylene backed tape used on shin pads or socks over the shin pads to help keep them in position. The pressure-sensitive tape is self-adhesive and water resistant, and is elastic so that there is less risk of cutting off circulation to the legs.  Shin tape is available in a variety of colors and is discarded after use.

Grip tape
Grip tape is a cloth backed tape with a cohesive coating on it. Cohesives are materials that stick to themselves but not to other surfaces. Grip tapes are produced in 2 styles:  elastic and non-elastic. The elastic version is softer and can make a soft grip surface that will conform to the person's grip during use. The non-elastic version is very abrasive. It will wear out the palms of hockey gloves very quickly so it is not widely marketed to the public.

See also
 List of adhesive tapes

References

Ice hockey equipment
Adhesive tape